Matevž Skok (born 2 September 1986) is a Slovenian handball player for RK Gorenje Velenje and the Slovenian national team.

References

External links
Eurohandball profile

1986 births
Living people
Sportspeople from Celje
Slovenian male handball players
Expatriate handball players
Slovenian expatriate sportspeople in Croatia
Slovenian expatriate sportspeople in Germany
Slovenian expatriate sportspeople in Portugal
Handball-Bundesliga players
RK Zagreb players
Olympic handball players of Slovenia
Handball players at the 2016 Summer Olympics
Sporting CP handball players